V24 may refer to:

 V24 engine
 V.24, a standard similar to RS-232
 Mil V-24, designation for early Mil Mi-24 mockup/prototype
 Fokker V.24, a German World War I fighter aircraft prototype